The 2012 San Diego City Attorney election occurred on Tuesday, June 5, 2012. Incumbent city attorney Jan Goldsmith ran unopposed and was reelected.

Municipal elections in California are officially non-partisan, although most members do identify a party preference. A two-round system was used for the election, starting with a primary in June followed by a runoff in November between the top-two candidates if no candidate received a majority in the primary. Because Goldsmith ran unopposed, he was elected outright in June with no need for a runoff election.

Results

References 

San Diego
San Diego City Attorney elections